(May 17, 1926 – December 28, 2014) was a Japanese educator who helped to introduce modern macrobiotics to the United States in the early 1950s. He lectured all over the world at conferences and seminars about philosophy, spiritual development, health, food, and diseases.

Background
After World War II, Kushi studied in Japan with macrobiotic educator, George Ohsawa.  After coming to America in 1949, Michio Kushi and Aveline Kushi, his wife, founded Erewhon Natural Foods, the East West Journal, the East West Foundation, the Kushi Foundation, One Peaceful World, and the Kushi Institute.  They wrote over 70 books.

Kushi studied law and international relations at the University of Tokyo, and after coming to America, he continued his studies at Columbia University in New York City.  Aveline preceded him in death (2001), as did their daughter (1995).  Michio Kushi lived in Brookline, Massachusetts.  He is survived by his second wife (Midori), four sons from his first marriage, and the resulting fourteen grandchildren and two great grandchildren. He died of pancreatic cancer at the age of 88.

Achievements

 1994 Kushi received the Award of Excellence from the United Nations Society of Writers.
1999 Mentioned in the Congressional record in recognition of the dedication and hard work to educate the world about the benefits of a macrobiotic diet.
1999 The Smithsonian Institution's National Museum of American History opened a permanent collection on macrobiotics and alternative health care in his name.  The title of the collection is the "Michio and Aveline Kushi Macrobiotics Collection." It is located in the Archives Center.

Michio and his first wife Aveline were founders of The Kushi Institute, located in Becket, Massachusetts through 2016, but formerly in a converted factory building in Brookline Village, Massachusetts, adjacent to Mission Hill, Boston.

For their "extraordinary contribution to diet, health, and world peace, and for serving as powerful examples of conscious living", they were awarded the Peace Abbey Courage of Conscience Award in Sherborn, Massachusetts, on October 14, 2000.

Criticism

Nutritionists have criticized Kushi's claim that a macrobiotic diet can cure cancer. Elizabeth Whelan and Frederick J. Stare have noted that:

Kushi's claim that cancer is largely due to his own versions of improper diet, thinking, and lifestyle is entirely without foundation. In his books, Kushi has recounted numerous case histories of persons whose cancer allegedly disappeared after following a macrobiotic diet. There are no available statistics on the outcome for all of these patients, but it is documented that at least some of them succumbed to their disease within a relatively short period. Reported testimonials of remission often uncovered the fact that the patients were also receiving conventional medical treatment at the same time.

Books
 1976: Introduction to Oriental Diagnosis. Red Moon Publications. 
 1977: The book of Macrobiotics. Japan Publications 
 1979: The book of Do-In. Japan publications. 
 1979: Natural Healing Through Macrobiotics. Japan Publications; (December 1979) 
 1980: How to See Your Health: Book of Oriental Diagnosis. Japan Publications (USA) (December 1980) 
 1982: Cancer and heart disease : the macrobiotic approach to degenerative disorders Japan publications. 
 1983: Your Face Never Lies. Wayne; (May 1, 1983) 
 1983: Macrobiotic pregnancy and care of the newborn. Japan publications. 
 1983: The Cancer Prevention Diet. St Martin's Press. 
 1985: Macrobiotic diet. Japan publications. 
 1985: Diabetes and hypoglycaemia : a natural approach. Japan publications. 
 1986: Macrobiotic child care and family health. Japan publications. 1986. 
 1986: On the Greater View: Collected Thoughts and Ideas on Macrobiotics and Humanity. Wayne NJ. 
 1990: AIDS, Macrobiotics and Natural Immunity. Japan Publications. 
 1990: The Gentle Art of Making Love. Avery Pub Group (May 1990) 
 1991: The macrobiotic approach to cancer. Garden City Park. 
 1991: Macrobiotics and Oriental medicine. Japan publications 
 1992: The gospel of peace : Jesus's teachings of eternal truth. Japan publications.

References

External links

Smithsonian Institute's Michio and Aveline Kushi Macrobiotics Collection
More information: www.michiokushi.org
A live Interview with Michio Kushi
Kushi Institute in Massachusetts
Letter from Michio: A message On behalf of Michio Kushi
Kushi institute in Lisbon, Portugal
Kushi Institute in Zagreb, Croatia
Kushi Institute in Barcelona, Spain
Kushi Institute in Amsterdam, the Netherlands

1926 births
2014 deaths
People from Brookline, Massachusetts
Japanese educators
People from Becket, Massachusetts
University of Tokyo alumni
Columbia University alumni
Japanese expatriates in the United States
Macrobiotic diet advocates